Jaroslav Kantůrek (born 17 August 1953) is a Czech basketball player. He competed in the men's tournament at the 1976 Summer Olympics.

See also
Czechoslovak Basketball League career stats leaders

References

External links
 

1953 births
Living people
Czech men's basketball players
Olympic basketball players of Czechoslovakia
Basketball players at the 1976 Summer Olympics
People from Poděbrady
Sportspeople from the Central Bohemian Region